Abdullah Al Saadi (born 1967) is an Emirati artist and one of the Pioneer "Five" original conceptual artists from the United Arab Emirates including Hassan Sharif, Hussain Sharif, Mohammed Kazem, and Mohammed Ahmed Ibrahim.

Exhibitions 
 2013 Emirati Expressions at Manarat Al Saadiyat, Abu Dhabi, UAE
 2013 Body Art and Performance in the Gulf Area: 16 artists at New York University Abu Dhabi, UAE 
 2011 Sharjah Biennial 10, Sharjah, UAE
 2011 54th International Art Exhibition of the Venice Biennale, Venice, Italy
 2009 53rd International Art Exhibition of the Venice Biennale, Venice, Italy 
 2005 Languages of the Desert at Kunstmuseum Bonn, Germany 
 2004 the 26th São Paulo Biennial, São Paulo, Brazil 
 2003 Sharjah Biennial 5, Sharjah, UAE 
 2002 The Art of the Five from the United Arab Emirates at the Ludwig Forum for International Art, Aachen, Germany.

See also 

 Hassan Sharif
 Mohammed Kazem
 Hussain Sharif

References 

Emirati conceptual artists
Emirati male artists
1967 births
Living people

known for 
Abdullah alsaadi was known for being"the artist that sees but in everything"